Grooove is King is the second studio album by American jazz and funk group Rock Candy Funk Party. It was released on July 31, 2015 through J&R Adventures. The album features Billy Gibbons from ZZ Top as "Mr Funkadamus".

Track listing 
All tracks written by Tal Bergman / Joe Bonamassa / Ron DeJesus / Michael Merritt unless indicated.

References

2015 albums
Rock Candy Funk Party albums